"Dr. Love" is a 1994 song by Norwegian singer Stella Getz, released by Mega Records as the second single from her debut album, Forbidden Dreams (1994). It was a top 10 hit in Denmark (#6) and a top 30 hit in Germany (#30), with a total of 11 weeks on the charts. In her native Norway, it reached number three on the radio chart Ti i skuddet. Outside Europe, "Dr. Love" was successful in Israel, peaking at number eight. A music video, directed by Nick Burgess-Jones was made to promote the single. It was A-listed on Germany's VIVA in July 1994. British magazine Music Week wrote in their review, "Bouncy Euro pop meets MC Kinky in this track by the 17-year-old Norwegian/Nigerian dancer and rapper who has Ace of Base as stablemates. The selection of ever harder dub mixes will get dancefloors pumping."

Track listing
 CD single, UK
"Dr. Love" (7" Version) – 2:53
"Dr. Love" (Extended Version) – 3:58
"Dr. Love" (Vocal Mix) – 6:04
"Dr. Love" (Dub Mix) – 6:05
"Dr. Love" (Hard Love Dub Mix) – 7:20   
"Dr. Love" (Hard Love Mix) – 8:22

 CD maxi, Scandinavia
"Dr. Love" (U.S Remix) – 2:24
"Dr. Love" (7" Version) – 2:53
"Dr. Love" (Dance Mix) – 6:33
"Dr. Love" (Medicine Man 12") – 10:21

Charts

External links
Stella Getz - Behind the Scenes (Forbidden Dreams EPK) [Part 1 of 2] 
Stella Getz - Behind the Scenes (Forbidden Dreams EPK) [Part 2 of 2]

References

 

1994 singles
1994 songs
English-language Norwegian songs
Mega Records singles
Music videos directed by Nick Burgess-Jones
Songs written by Mikkel Storleer Eriksen
Stella Getz songs